Astele rubiginosa is a species of sea snail, a marine gastropod mollusk in the family Calliostomatidae.

Description
The size of the shell varies between 19 mm and 30 mm.
The imperforate, rather thin shell has an acutely conical shape. The ten whorls are plane. The first one is eroded and smooth. The following  whorls are whitish buff, radiately flamed with brown and reddish. They are spirally cingulate with six granose cinguli. The upper 5 are small, separated by equal interstices. The lower cingulus is wider, more prominent and subcrenate. The body whorl is acutely carinated. The base of the shell is  concentrically encircled by about 7-8 granose cinguli, alternately buff and rose colored. The aperture is subquadrate. The outer lip is plicate. The  columella is subarcuate. The base is subnodose, with a parallel groove.

Distribution
This marine species occurs off Southern Australia and Tasmania.

References

External links
 To Encyclopedia of Life
 To World Register of Marine Species
 

rubiginosa
Gastropods described in 1846